Visa requirements for Norwegian citizens are administrative entry restrictions by the authorities of other states placed on citizens of Norway.  Norwegian citizens had visa-free or visa on arrival access to 185 countries and territories, ranking the Norwegian passport 7th overall in terms of travel freedom (tied with the Czech Republic, Greece, Malta, the United Kingdom and the United States) according to the Henley Passport Index.

As a member state of the European Free Trade Association (EFTA), Norwegian citizens enjoy freedom of movement to live and work in other EFTA countries in accordance with the EFTA convention. Moreover, by virtue of Norway's membership of the European Economic Area (EEA), Norwegian citizens also enjoy freedom of movement within all EEA member states. The Citizens’ Rights Directive defines the right of free movement for citizens of the EEA, and all EFTA and EU citizens are not only visa-exempt but are legally entitled to enter and reside in each other's countries.

In order to travel to another country, a Norwegian citizen requires a passport, except within the Nordic Passport Union, where no identity card is formally required. However, an identity card such as a Norwegian driving licence is useful. A passport is also not required for holders of the Norwegian national identity card for travel to EU or EFTA countries, as well as certain other countries.

Visa requirements map

Visa requirements

Pre-approved visas pick-up
Pre-approved visas can be picked up on arrival in the following countries instead in embassy or consulate.

Territories, disputed areas or restricted zones
Visa requirements for Norwegian citizens for visits to various territories, disputed areas, partially recognized countries and restricted zones:

Non-visa restrictions

Consular protection of Norwegian citizens abroad

When in a country with no Norwegian representation, Norwegian citizens may seek assistance from public officials in the foreign services of any of the Nordic countries. This is afforded by the Helsinki Treaty which states that public officials in the foreign services of any of the Nordic countries shall assist citizens of another Nordic country if that country is not represented in the territory concerned.

See also

Norwegian passport
Norwegian identity card
Visa requirements for EFTA nationals
 Visa policy of the Schengen Area

References and Notes
References

Notes

Norway